Hospital Church is a medieval fortified church of the Knights Hospitaller and a National Monument in Hospital, County Limerick, Ireland.

The church is located on Main Street, Hospital, to the west of the R513.

History

The church was founded before 1215 by Geoffrey de Marisco (d. 1245) as a commandery of the Knights Hospitaller who had owned land in the area since 1200.

Conor O'Brien (Unknown-1203) buried here, was a Gaelic nobel and Knight Hospitalier who took part in the 3rd Crusade. He was knighted by King Richard I Coeur-deLeon, King of England, during the course of the 3rd Crusade. The Irish monks at the Abbey of St. Peter in Ratisbon, Germany recorded his oversea journey.

The church was dissolved in 1540 during the Dissolution of the Monasteries and then leased, along with its contents, to William Aspley and then to the Browne family.

Church

This is a fortified church built for defence with high walls, prominent base batter and narrow arched windows.

A tower sits at the west end with a partial barrel vault on the second floor.

In the west wall is a medieval carving of the crucifixion of Jesus.

On the interior of the east wall are two 13th/14th tombs with effigies:
a double tomb depicting a knight and his wife

References

Barrysfarm HospitalChurch
Barrysfarm HospitalChurch
Barrysfarm HospitalChurch
Barrysfarm HospitalChurch
Barrysfarm HospitalChurch